Isaac Wilson (1840 – 7 April 1912) was a 19th-century Member of Parliament in Canterbury, New Zealand. He represented the Kaiapoi electorate from 1881 to 7 April 1884, when he resigned because of failing health, and was replaced by Edward Richardson.

In 1897 he was on the Kaiapoi Licensing Committee. and a committee member for the Kaiapoi Brass Band.
 
He died in Sumner, Christchurch leaving a widow (Elizabeth) and young children. He was from Wray, Westmorland and arrived with his family in New Zealand about 1854. He had various business interests including the Kaiapoi Woollen Mills; and was on the Ashley County Council, the Kaiapoi Borough and the Canterbury Provincial Council before becoming an MP (MHR) in 1881, defeating the Liberal candidate.

References

1840 births
1912 deaths
Members of the New Zealand House of Representatives
New Zealand MPs for South Island electorates
19th-century New Zealand politicians
People from Westmorland
English emigrants to New Zealand